E Squadron, formerly the Increment, is a British military unit tasked with conducting covert operations, paramilitary operations and others at the behest of the Director Special Forces and Chief of the Secret Intelligence Service. Its members are selected from the United Kingdom Special Forces (UKSF), Defence Intelligence and are trained and tasked with carrying out operations in close contact with the Secret Intelligence Service (SIS), commonly known as MI6.                   

Its name was publicly mentioned in an email sent out by the United Kingdom’s Ministry of Defence in 2021.                   
              
This article is a review of both SIS Paramilitary Operations and E Squadron, the unit drawn primarily from UKSF.

Operations alongside the CIA 

E Squadron has been known to operate alongside and in conjunction with the U.S.' Central Intelligence Agency's (CIA's) Directorate of Operations' (DO) Special Activities Center's Special Operations Group's (SAC/SOG) Ground Branch.

History (including the Increment) 

The Increment, the predecessor of E Squadron, can trace its roots back, in function and role, to the Special Operations Executive (SOE) of MI6 formed during WW2.  

From Richard Tomlinson's book, The Big Breach, detailing the accounts of his experience as an SIS Intelligence Officer, the basic facts about the composition of the Increment and its relation to SIS are noted:  

The army provides a detachment from the SAS regiment, called Revolutionary Warfare Wing in Hereford, and the navy provides a small detachment from their Special Boat Service in Poole. Both have similar roles as far as MI6 is concerned and are known collectively within the service as the `increment'. To qualify for the increment, SAS and SBS personnel must have served for at least five years and have reached the rank of sergeant. They are security vetted by MI6 and given a short induction course into the function and objectives of the service. If they have not already learnt surveillance skills, they take a three- week course at the Fort. Back at their bases in Hereford and Poole, their already substantial military skills are fine-tuned. They learn how to use improvised explosives and sabotage techniques, as well as advanced VIP protection skills, study guerilla warfare organisation and practise advanced insertion techniques - for example high-altitude parachuting from commercial aircraft or covert landings from submarines. Advanced civilian qualifications are acquired: several of the SBS Increment have commercial ship's skipper's tickets in their alias name, enabling them legally to hire, say, a fishing trawler. 

On the IONEC, a week of the course is dedicated to familiarisation with the increment and the S&D flight and `military week' was eagerly anticipated by most of us.

IONEC is an acronym for the "Intelligence Officers New Entry Course", the programme in which Intelligence Officer recruits/trainees at SIS enroll. Some of the training, specifically the firearms training, takes place at Fort Monckton.    

From the personal blog of former British Army 22 SAS Soldier Colin Armstrong best known by his pseudonym Chris Ryan:     

I've been asked if the Increment is real, and if the kind of deniable 'black' ops I depict in my novel of that title really happen. The Increment most definitely exists. It's a small group of badged guys who are part of E Squadron. They are specially selected for their skill, which is amazing even by SAS standards. They have to undergo incredibly stringent background security checks because they are entrusted with the most sensitive operations within the entire military. To be a member of the Increment is to be the best of the best.

Selection, Training and Operations 
Increment members were drawn, as previously stated, primarily from the Revolutionary Warfare Wing (RWW) of 22 SAS and from the equivalent wing of the SBS or the SBS itself. They were deployed for assassinations, sabotage or dangerous/high-risk operations such as the arresting of war criminals in the Balkans.

Living persons closely affiliated with E Squadron or its predecessor, the Increment 

Matthew Howard Dunn is a former SIS Intelligence Officer, who worked with the Increment during his active time in the service.  He, being an Intelligence Officer, was in the SIS's (MI6's) Directorate of Requirements and Production, SIS's operational directorate,   analogous to the CIA's Directorate of Operations (DO). 

“Officers operating in particularly hazardous areas were those who had excelled in the paramilitary side of training. I worked with the Increment, the SAS unit attached to SIS. 

They provided back-up for anything that might be extremely dangerous. I was trained in close quarter and unarmed combat. I was good at it, I enjoyed it. Yes, there is an element of James Bond. There were no watches that could burn holes through walls but you might have a letter with explosives in it that could blow off a door.”

It has been stated in his bio  that:

...typically he operated in highly hostile environments where, if compromised and captured, he would have been executed. 

Matthew was trained in all aspects of intelligence collection and direct action, including agent running and debriefing, deep-cover deployments, small-arms, explosives, military unarmed combat, surveillance, anti-surveillance, counter-surveillance, advanced driving, infiltration and exfiltration techniques, and covert communications. His skills were widely deployed by him in the field. Matthew typically worked alone but he also had significant experience of working with highly-specialised units of the British SAS and SBS...

SIS Paramilitary Operations 

Although SIS has routinely and consistently denied arming its officers, carrying out paramilitary operations and special operations, it has been well-known to do so, not least due to the accounts of former SIS employees, including operations/case officers, especially those working with paramilitary units of the British Government. 

One myth is the false notion of needing a 'licence to kill'. An intelligence officer is nominally conducting espionage, which is illegal, so the concept of needing a licence to kill is irrelevant.

See Also 

 CIA Special Activities Center’s Special Operations Group
 Covert Operations

References        

 Special forces of the United Kingdom